The 1964 Individual Long Track European Championship was the eighth edition of the Long Track European Championship. The final was held on 6 September 1964 in Scheeßel, West Germany.

The title was won by Kurt W. Petersen of Denmark.

Venues
1st Qualifying Round - Copenhagen, 3 May 1964
Qualifying Round 2 - Örebro, 7 June 1964
Qualifying Round 3 - Plattling 2 Aug 1964
Final -  Scheeßel, 6 September 1964

Final Classification

References 

Motor
Motor
International sports competitions hosted by West Germany